Riverside  is an OC Transpo bus station on Ottawa's Transitway that is connected to the Riverside Campus of The Ottawa Hospital near the intersection of Smyth Road and Riverside Drive. Stairs and elevators from the platform level lead directly to the interior of the hospital, making bus travel easy for medical appointments even in bad weather.

The hospital is the primary trip generator and main purpose for this station. There are no connecting bus routes here.

The station was built when the hospital underwent a major expansion of its facility. It agreed to let the transitway pass in its terrain and open a new station as there were initially no stations to be built at that location. The 4,200 square feet new administration wing and Transit station was completed in 1991.

Service

The following routes serve Riverside:

Notes 
 Route  travels along Smyth Road, just north of the station, Monday-Saturday.

References

External links
Ottawa Hospital
OC Transpo station page
OC Transpo Area Map

1991 establishments in Ontario
Transitway (Ottawa) stations